Masempe Theko (born 4 July 1987) is a swimmer from Lesotho, born in the capital city  Maseru. 

She competed at the 2011 World Aquatics Championships in Shanghai, finishing the heats of the 50 metre freestyle event in 87th place. At the 2012 Summer Olympics in London she also swam in the heats of the 50 metre freestyle, ending in 73rd place. She did not advance to the semi-finals in either event.

References

External links

1987 births
Living people
Lesotho female swimmers
Olympic swimmers of Lesotho
Swimmers at the 2012 Summer Olympics
People from Maseru